Franklin "Pete" Adreon (November 18, 1902 – September 10, 1979) was an American film and television director, producer, screenwriter, and actor.

Early life and career
Born in Gambrills, Maryland, Adreon was a Marine Reservist during the 30s, and served in the United States Marine Corps in World War II.  Serving initially with the 6th Marines in Iceland, Major Adreon was put in charge of the Marine Corps Photographic Unit in Quantico.

Adreon, an ex-bond salesman who entered motion pictures in 1935 with no experience, landed some small paying jobs, including as a technical advisor on the serial The Fighting Marines (in which he also appeared in the role of Captain Holmes).  This led to a writing position at Mascot Pictures and its successor Republic Pictures.  Adreon stayed with the serial unit and soon, through hard work and toil, was awarded the title of associate producer. Adreon stayed with the studio for nearly all of its short life. He worked with serial director William Witney at Republic Pictures, who was also in the Marines in the war.

He then worked as a director, producer, and writer on various television series and films.

Adreon died on September 10, 1979, in Thousand Oaks, California, at the age of 76.

Selected filmography

References

External links

 

1902 births
1979 deaths
American male film actors
Film producers from California
United States Marine Corps personnel of World War II
American male screenwriters
American television directors
Television producers from California
Film serial crew
United States Marine Corps officers
United States Marine Corps reservists
People from Gambrills, Maryland
20th-century American male actors
People from Thousand Oaks, California
20th-century American businesspeople
Screenwriters from California
Screenwriters from Maryland
20th-century American male writers
20th-century American screenwriters
Military personnel from California